Tibéita is a town in central Ivory Coast. It is a sub-prefecture of Bouaflé Department in Marahoué Region, Sassandra-Marahoué District.

Tibéita was a commune until March 2012, when it became one of 1126 communes nationwide that were abolished.

In 2014, the population of the sub-prefecture of Tibéita was 15,664.

Villages
The 9 villages of the sub-prefecture of Tibéita and their population in 2014 are:
 Baziafla (791)
 Bohitiéfla (232)
 Bouafla (4 436)
 Danagoro (3 277)
 Dianfla (1 090)
 Tibéita (1 899)
 Zanhouofla (563)
 Zoola (3 376)

Notes

Sub-prefectures of Marahoué
Former communes of Ivory Coast